The Shwedagon Pagoda; ; officially named Shwedagon Zedi Daw and also known as the Great Dagon Pagoda and the Golden Pagoda is a gilded stupa located in Yangon, Myanmar.

The Shwedagon is the most sacred Buddhist pagoda in Myanmar, as it is believed to contain relics of the four previous Buddhas of the present kalpa. These relics include the staff of Kakusandha, the water filter of Koṇāgamana, a piece of the robe of Kassapa, and eight strands of hair from the head of Gautama.

History

Legend holds that the Shwedagon Pagoda was constructed more than 2,500 years ago — while the Buddha was still alive — which would make it the oldest Buddhist stupa in the world. According to the Buddhavaṃsa, two merchants from Ukkalājanapada named Tapussa and Bhallika were passing through Bodh Gaya when they encountered the Buddha. The Buddha, who was at that time enjoying the bliss of his newly attained buddhahood as he sat under a rājāyatana tree, accepted their offering of rice cake and honey and taught them some of the dharma in return. In so doing, they became the first lay disciples to take refuge in the teachings of the Buddha. The Buddha also gave eight strands of his hair to the merchants and gave them instructions on how to construct a stupa in which to enshrine these hair relics. The merchants presented the eight strands of hair to King Okkalapa of Dagon, who enshrined the strands along with some relics of the three preceding Buddhas (Kakusandha, Koṇāgamana, and Kassapa) in a stupa on the Singuttara Hill in present-day Myanmar.

Contemporary inscriptional evidence, the Shwedagon Pagoda Inscriptions from the reign of King Dhammazedi of Hanthawaddy (r. 1471–1492), shows a list of repairs of the pagoda going back to 1436. By the beginning of the 16th century, Shwedagon Pagoda had become the most famous Buddhist pilgrimage site in Burma.

A series of earthquakes during the following centuries caused damage. A new hti was donated by King Mindon in 1871, nearly two decades after the annexation of Lower Burma by the British. A moderate earthquake in October 1970 left the shaft of the hti out of alignment; extensive repairs were needed to rectify the problem.

The Shwedagon Pagoda Festival, which is the largest pagoda festival in the country, begins during the new moon of the month of Tabaung in the traditional Burmese calendar and continues until the full moon. The pagoda is on the Yangon City Heritage List.

Design 

The stupa's plinth is made of bricks covered with gold plates. Above the base are terraces that only monks and other males can access. Next is the bell-shaped part of the stupa. Above that is the turban, then the inverted almsbowl, inverted and upright lotus petals, the banana bud and then the umbrella crown. The crown is tipped with 5,448 diamonds and 2,317 rubies. Immediately before the diamond bud is a flag-shaped vane. The very top—the diamond bud—is tipped with a 76 carat (15 g) diamond.

The gold seen on the stupa is made of genuine gold plates, covering the brick structure and attached by traditional rivets. People all over the country, as well as successive monarchs, starting from Queen Shin Saw Pu, have donated gold to the pagoda to maintain it.

There are four entrances, each leading up a flight of steps to the platform on Singuttara Hill. A pair of giant leogryphs guards each entrance. The eastern and southern approaches have vendors selling books, good luck charms, images of the Buddha, candles, gold leaf, incense sticks, prayer flags, streamers, miniature umbrellas and flowers.

It is customary to circumnavigate Buddhist stupas in a clockwise direction. In accordance with this principle, one may begin at the eastern directional shrine, which houses a statue of Kakusandha, the first Buddha of the present kalpa. Next, at the southern directional shrine, is a statue of the second Buddha, Koṇāgamana. Next, at the western directional shrine, is that of the third Buddha, Kassapa. Finally, at the northern directional shrine, is that of the fourth Buddha, Gautama.

Rituals 

Though most Burmese are Theravada Buddhists, many also follow practices which originated in Hindu astrology. The Burmese astrology recognizes the seven planets of astrology — the Sun, Moon, Mercury, Venus, Mars, Jupiter, and Saturn, and in addition, two other planets, Rahu and Ketu. All the names of the planets are borrowed from Hindu astrology, but the Burmese Rahu and Ketu are different from the Hindu Rahu and Ketu. The Burmese consider them to be distinct and separate planets, whereas Hindu astrology considers them to be either the Dragon's Head and Tails, or Ascending and Descending Nodes. To the Burmese, Ketu is the king of all planets. As in many other languages, the Burmese name the seven days of their week after the seven planets, but Burmese astrology recognizes an eight-day week, with Wednesday being divided into two days: until 6:00p.m. it is Wednesday, but from 6:00p.m. until midnight it is Rahu's day.

It is important for Burmese Buddhists to know on which day of the week they were born, as this determines their planetary post. There are eight planetary posts, as Wednesday is split in two (a.m. and p.m.). They are marked by animals that represent the day — garuda for Sunday, tiger for Monday, lion for Tuesday, tusked elephant for Wednesday morning, tuskless elephant for Wednesday afternoon, mouse for Thursday, guinea pig for Friday and nāga for Saturday. Each planetary post has a Buddha image and devotees offer flowers and prayer flags and pour water on the image with a prayer and a wish called a Blessing Ritual. At the base of the post behind the image is a guardian angel, and underneath the image is the animal representing that particular day. The plinth of the stupa is octagonal and also surrounded by eight small shrines (one for each planetary post). It is customary to circumnavigate Buddhist stupas in a clockwise direction. Many devotees perform a blessing ritual by pouring water at their planetary post.

The pilgrim, on his way up the steps of the pagoda, buys flowers, candles, coloured flags and streamers. These are to be placed at the stupa in a symbolic act of giving, an important aspect of Buddhist teaching. There are donation boxes located in various places around the pagoda to receive voluntary offerings which may be given to the pagoda for general purposes. In December 2017, foreigners were charged a Ks.10,000/- (approx. US$7) entrance fee.

Shwedagon in literature 
Rudyard Kipling described his 1889 visit to Shwedagon Pagoda ten years later in From Sea to Sea and Other Sketches, Letters of Travel

War and invasion 

In 1608 the Portuguese adventurer Filipe de Brito e Nicote, known as Nga Zinka to the Burmese, plundered the Shwedagon Pagoda. His men took the 300-ton Great Bell of Dhammazedi, donated in 1485 by the Mon King Dhammazedi. De Brito's intention was to melt the bell down to make cannons, but it fell into the Bago River when he was carrying it across. To this date, it has not been recovered.

Two centuries later, the British landed on May 11, 1824, during the First Anglo-Burmese War. They immediately seized and occupied the Shwedagon Pagoda and used it as a fortress until they left two years later. There was pillaging and vandalism, and one officer's excuse for digging a tunnel into the depths of the stupa was to find out if it could be used as a gunpowder magazine. The Maha Gandha (lit. great sweet sound) Bell, a 23-ton bronze bell cast in 1779 and donated by King Singu and popularly known as the Singu Min Bell, was carried off with the intention to ship it to Kolkata. It met the same fate as the Dhammazedi Bell and fell into the river. When the British failed in their attempts to recover it, the people offered to help provided it could be restored to the stupa. The British, thinking it would be in vain, agreed, upon which divers went in to tie hundreds of bamboo poles underneath the bell and floated it to the surface. There has been much confusion over this bell and the 42-ton Tharrawaddy Min Bell donated in 1841 by Tharrawaddy Min along with 20 kg of gold plating; this massive ornate bell hangs in its pavilion in the northeast corner of the stupa. A different but less plausible version of the account of the Singu Min Bell was given by Lt. J.E. Alexander in 1827. This bell can be seen hung in another pavilion in the northwest of the pagoda platform.

The Second Anglo-Burmese War saw the British re-occupation of the Shwedagon in April 1852, only this time the stupa was to remain under their military control for 77 years, until 1929, although the people were given access to the Paya.

During the British occupation and fortification of the Pagoda, Lord Maung Htaw Lay, the most prominent Mon-Burmese in British Burma, successfully prevented the British Army from looting of the treasures; he eventually restored the Pagoda to its former glory and status with the financial help from the British rulers. This extract is from the book “A Twentieth Century Burmese Matriarch” written by his great-great-great grand daughter Khin Thida.

Political area 

In 1920, students from Burma's only university met at a pavilion on the southwest corner of the Shwedagon pagoda and planned a protest strike against the new University Act which they believed would only benefit the elite and perpetuate colonial rule. This place is now commemorated by a memorial. The result of the ensuing University Boycott was the establishment of "national schools" financed and run by the Burmese people; this day has been commemorated as the Burmese National Day since. During the second university students strike in history of 1936, the terraces of the Shwedagon were again where the student strikers camped out.

In 1938, oilfield workers on strike hiked all the way from the oilfields of Chauk and Yenangyaung in central Burma to Rangoon to establish a strike camp at the Shwedagon Pagoda. This strike, supported by the public as well as students and came to be known as the '1300 Revolution' after the Burmese calendar year, was broken up by the police who, in their boots whereas Burmese would remove their shoes in pagoda precincts, raided the strike camps on the pagoda.

The "shoe question" on the pagoda has always been a sensitive issue to the Burmese people since colonial times. The Burmese people had always removed shoes at all Buddhist pagodas. Hiram Cox, the British envoy to the Burmese Court, in 1796, observed the tradition by not visiting the pagoda rather than take off his shoes. However, after the annexation of lower Burma, European visitors as well as troops posted at the pagoda openly flouted the tradition. U Dhammaloka publicly confronted a police officer over wearing shoes at the pagoda in 1902. It was not until 1919 that the British authorities finally issued a regulation prohibiting footwear in the precincts of the pagoda. However, they put in an exception that employees of the government on official business were allowed footwear. The regulation and its exception clause moved to stir up the people and played a role in the beginnings of the nationalist movement. Today, no footwear or socks are allowed on the pagoda.

In January 1946, General Aung San addressed a mass meeting at the stupa, demanding "independence now" from the British with a thinly veiled threat of a general strike and uprising. Forty-two years later, on August 26, 1988, his daughter, Aung San Suu Kyi addressed another mass meeting of 500,000 people at the stupa, demanding democracy from the military regime and calling the 8888 Uprising the second struggle for independence.

September 2007 protests 
In September 2007, during nationwide demonstrations against the military regime and its recently enacted price increases, protesting monks were denied access to the pagoda for several days before the government finally relented and permitted them in.

On September 24, 2007, 20,000 bhikkhus and thilashins (the largest protest in 20 years) marched at the Shwedagon Pagoda, Yangon. On Monday, 30,000 people led by 15,000 monks marched from Shwedagon Pagoda and past the offices of Aung San Suu Kyi's opposition National League for Democracy (NLD) party. Comedian Zarganar and star Kyaw Thu brought food and water to the monks. On Saturday, monks marched to greet Aung San Suu Kyi, who is under house arrest. On Sunday, about 150 nuns joined the marchers. On September 25, 2007, 2,000 monks and supporters defied threats from Myanmar's junta. They marched to Yangon streets at Shwedagon Pagoda amid army trucks and the warning of Brigadier-General Myint Maung not to violate Buddhist "rules and regulations."

On September 26, 2007, clashes between security forces and thousands of protesters led by Buddhist monks in Myanmar have left at least five protesters dead by Myanmar security forces, according to opposition reports, in an anticipated crackdown. Earlier in the day security authorities used tear gas, warning shots and force to break up a peaceful demonstration by scores of monks gathered around the Shwedagon Pagoda.

The web site reports that protesting "monks were beaten and bundled into waiting army trucks," adding about 50 monks were arrested and taken to undisclosed locations.
In addition, the opposition said "soldiers with assault rifles have sealed off sacred Buddhist monasteries ... as well as other flashpoints of anti-government protests."
It reports that the violent crackdown came as about 100 monks defied a ban by venturing into a cordoned-off area around the Shwedagon Pagoda, Myanmar's holiest Buddhist shrine.

It says that authorities ordered the crowd to disperse, but witnesses said the monks sat down and began praying, defying the military government's ban on public assembly.
Security forces at the pagoda "struck out at demonstrators" and attacked "several hundred other monks and supporters," the opposition web site detailed.
Monks were ushered away by authorities and loaded into waiting trucks while several hundred onlookers watched, witnesses said. Some managed to escape and headed towards the Sule Pagoda, a Buddhist monument and landmark located in Yangon's city centre.

Replicas 
Uppatasanti Pagoda—located in Naypyidaw, the capital of Myanmar—is a replica of Shwedagon Pagoda. Completed in 2009, it is similar in many aspects to Shwedagon Pagoda, but its height is  less than that of Shwedagon.

Another replica of Shwedagon Pagoda,  in height, was constructed at Lumbini Natural Park in Berastagi, North Sumatra, Indonesia. Completed in 2010, the construction materials for this pagoda, were imported from Myanmar.

Tachileik Shwedagon Pagoda near the Golden Triangle in Myanmar.

Gallery

See also 

 Awgatha
 Gadaw
 Shinbyu
 Burmese pagoda
 Pagoda festival
 Buddhism in Burma
 History of Buddhism
 List of tallest structures built before the 20th century

Notes

References

Further reading 
 
 
 
 "Dictionary of Buddhism" by Damien Keown (Oxford University Press, 2003)

External links 

 
 Official Website of the Shwedagon Pagoda for the Shwedagon Pagoda Board of Trustees
 The Legend of Shwedagon by Khin Myo Chit
 My Child-life in Burmah by Olive Jennie Bixby 1880 recollections of a missionary's daughter : inc. detailed description of King Mindon's new hti being erected, pp 111
 Rudyard Kipling's description of Shwedagon Pagoda in 1889
 Elizabeth Moore conference the shwedagon in british burma myanmar
 Lt. J.E. Alexander's account, 1827, p. 153
 Myanmar: Time to say hello YouTube
 "Scene upon the Terrace of the Great Dagon Pagoda" from 1826

Buddhist pilgrimage sites in Myanmar
Pagodas in Myanmar
Buddhist temples in Yangon
Historic sites in Myanmar
Tourist attractions in Myanmar
Buddhist relics
6th-century Buddhist temples